Brachyscome dentata, commonly known as lobe-seed daisy, is a tufted perennial herb in the family Asteraceae and is endemic to Australia. It has mostly white or mauve daisy-like flowers, a yellow centre and pale green leaves. It is endemic to Australia.

Description
The leaves and stems may have occasional to thickly covered woolly hairs. The overlapping bracts lance-shaped, rounded or sharply pointed and jagged. Flowering occurs in spring and summer.

Taxonomy and naming
The species was first formally described in 1830 by Charles Gaudichaud-Beaupré and the description was published in Voyage Autour du Monde ... sur les Corvettes de S.M. l'Uranie et la Physicienne. Botanique. The specific epithet (dentata) is derived from the Latin dentatus meaning "toothed" with reference to the toothed margins.

Distribution and habitat
In Victoria it grows in southern districts to Geelong, east to Barnawartha and west to Wimmera, growing in a variety of habitats including grasslands on basalt, sandy loam in woodlands and heavy clay. In New South Wales it is a widespread species throughout the state in a variety of habitats, usually in floodplains. In Queensland it is found growing in the Darling Downs.

References

dentata
Flora of New South Wales
Flora of Victoria (Australia)
Flora of South Australia
Flora of Queensland
Plants described in 1830